The Vickers Type 279 Venom was a British low-wing monoplane single-seat, single-engined, eight-gun fighter aircraft. It was fast and manoeuvrable but its Bristol Aquila radial engine was underpowered. Together with other designs built to the same specification, which included the Bristol Type 146, Gloster F.5/34, and Martin-Baker MB 2, it was rejected by the Air Ministry and only one Venom was built.

Design and development
Submissions were expected to use a radial engine for good performance in the tropics Vickers based their entrant on their earlier Type 151 Jockey fighter, using the same wing and tail airfoil sections and dimensions but replacing the Wibault-Vickers ribbed construction of the Jockey with a more modern smooth stressed-skin structure.

The Venom (originally known as the Jockey Mk II) was a low-wing monoplane, with square-tipped constant chord wings and tailplane. The fin, too, was square-tipped but the rather angular appearance did not extend to the fuselage, whose circular cross section tapered rearwards from the engine's long chord cowling back to the tail. The pilot sat over the wing in a perspex-enclosed cockpit, which had additional windows in the fuselage to enhance the side and downwards view. The inverted U-shaped fairing behind the cockpit extended back to the base of the fin.

The fuselage was an alloy-skinned monocoque structure of polygonal section, and the thicker plates of the wings were also stressed, taking the drag loads. The wings carried flaps that could extend to 90° and there was a wide track, inward-retracting main undercarriage as well as a small fixed tailwheel. Flaps and undercarriage were electrically operated. The RAF 34 wing section provided sufficient depth for the installation of the required eight Browning machine guns. The Venom was powered by a  Bristol Aquila AE-3S sleeve valve radial engine, hinge-mounted so it could be swung sideways for easy maintenance. The Aquila drove a three-bladed propeller. Joseph "Mutt" Summers flew the Venom on its first flight on 17 June 1936. Unlike the Hurricane and Spitfire, the Venom was fitted with its full armament from its first flight.

Testing and evaluation
Publicly unveiled at the 1936 Society of British Aircraft Constructors (SBAC) display, the Venom appeared in natural polished metal and silver dope on the fabric control surfaces, with temporary company registration markings of PVO-10. The Venom has a better rate of roll and turn than its long nosed water-cooled competitors but it was soon clear the potential power from the Merlin was greater than was likely to be possible from the Aquila, while no other engines were available that were suitable for such a small airframe. Jeffrey Quill flew the Venom from Eastleigh, mixing it with Spitfires but the Venom's flying was limited by engine problems. Later flying with RAF roundels and marked with "3" on the fuselages sides, the Venom was painted a cream colour for exhibition purposes. The sole Venom prototype was scrapped in 1939, following a crash during a test flight.

Specifications

See also

References

Notes

Bibliography

 Andrews, C. F. and E. B. Morgan. Vickers Aircraft since 1908, 2nd ed. London: Putnam, 1988. .
 
 Goulding, James. Interceptor. London: Ian Allan, 1986. .
 Lewis, Peter. "Vickers Type 279 Venom." Air Pictorial, Volume 29, No. 8, August 1967.
 Mason, Francis K. The British Fighter since 1912. Annapolis, Maryland: Naval Institute Press, 1992. .

1930s British fighter aircraft
Venom
Single-engined tractor aircraft
Low-wing aircraft
Aircraft first flown in 1936